John Zaremba (October 22, 1908 – December 15, 1986) was an American actor most noted for supporting roles on science fiction films and television series.

The Chicago-born Zaremba was a journalist for the Grand Rapids Press and Chicago Tribune newspapers until 1949, when he moved to Hollywood and became an actor. In 1962, he appeared as "Stone" on The Virginian in the episode, "It tolls for Thee". He appeared in eleven episodes of Alfred Hitchcock Presents. His regular roles included Dr. Harold Jansen in Ben Casey (1961–1966), Dr. Raymond Swain in The Time Tunnel (1966–1967), and a judge in Owen Marshall: Counselor at Law (1971-1974). While first appearing as a Captain Martin in a 1963 episode ("A Letter for Fuji") of McHale's Navy, he would make four more recurring appearances in subsequent episodes in 1964 and 1965, all as Admiral Hardesty.

Zaremba was the television spokesman for Hills Brothers Coffee in the 1970s and early 1980s, playing a fictional coffee bean buyer, traveling the world in search of the best quality coffee beans.

Career
Zaremba appeared in 139 films and television shows.

Film

 Pirates of the High Seas (1950, Serial) - Dr. Schmidt [Ch.10] (uncredited)
 Young Man with Ideas (1952) - Court Clerk (uncredited)
 The Magnetic Monster (1953) - Chief Watson
 Human Desire (1954) - 'Russ' Russell, Train Conductor (uncredited)
 Tight Spot (1955) - Second Policeman (uncredited)
 Cell 2455, Death Row (1955) - District Attorney (uncredited)
 5 Against the House (1955) - Robert Fenton (uncredited)
 Chicago Syndicate (1955) - Det. Lt. Robert Fenton
 Apache Ambush (1955) - The President's Secretary (uncredited)
 Ransom! (1956) - Telephone Technician (uncredited)
 The Houston Story (1956) - Emile Constant
 Earth vs. the Flying Saucers (1956) - Prof. Kanter
 He Laughed Last (1956) - Big Dan's Doctor (uncredited)
 The Power and the Prize (1956) - Fred Delehanty - Office Worker (uncredited)
 Reprisal! (1956) - Mr. Willard (uncredited)
 Hit and Run (1957) - Doctor
 The Night the World Exploded (1957) - Daniel J. Winters (Asst. Secretary of Defense) (uncredited)
 20 Million Miles to Earth (1957) - Dr. Judson Uhl
 Zero Hour! (1957) - Passenger with Sick Wife (uncredited)
 The Power of the Resurrection (1958) - Samuel
 Young and Wild (1958) - Sgt. Larsen
 Juvenile Jungle (1958) - Mr. Murray (uncredited)
 The Case Against Brooklyn (1958) - Assistant District Attorney Heller (uncredited)
 The Saga of Hemp Brown (1958) - Military Prosecutor (uncredited)
 Tarawa Beachhead (1958) - Second Staff Officer Speaking (uncredited)
 Frankenstein's Daughter (1958) - Police Lt. Boyle
 Battle of the Coral Sea (1959) - Air Admiral (uncredited)
 Vice Raid (1960) - Sidney Marsh (uncredited)
 Because They're Young (1960) - Mr. Trent (uncredited)
 The Gallant Hours (1960) - Maj. Gen. Millard F. Harmon (uncredited)
 Key Witness (1960) - Reporter (uncredited)
 The Lawbreakers (1961) - Sergeant John Ervine 
 Moon Pilot (1962) - Security Officer Conducting Lineup (uncredited)
 Dangerous Charter (1962) - FBI Special Agent (shot in 1958)
 A Gathering of Eagles (1963) - Flight Surgeon (uncredited)
 Follow Me, Boys! (1966) - Ralph's Lawyer (uncredited)
 R. P. M. (1970) - President Tyler
 Scandalous John (1971) - Wales
 The War Between Men and Women (1972) - Minister
 Herbie Rides Again (1974) - Lawyer - First Team
 Brothers (1977) - Judge #2
 Return to Fantasy Island (1978) - Dr. Croyden

Television

 I Led Three Lives (1953-1956) - Special Agent Jerry Dressler 
 Dragnet (1955)
 Alfred Hitchcock Presents (1957-1962) - Various characters
 Sea Hunt (1959-1961) - Dr. Bruney / George Emerson / Police Chief Coleman / Lee Bellum / Charlie Keller / Dr. Bartock
 Zorro (1959) - Magistrado
 Alcoa Presents: One Step Beyond  ('Earthquake', episode) (1959) (broadcast US, 12th. Dec.) - Clerk of the Court
 Maverick (1960) - Gantry
 Dennis the Menace (1961) - Arthur Prilych
 Disneyland (1961) - Reverend Graves
 Ben Casey (1961-1965) - Dr. Harold Jensen
 The Virginian (1962-1967) - Mayor / Polk / Warden / Undertaker / Stone
 Perry Mason (1962-1963) - Medical Examiner / Coroner's Physician / Doctor Wales / Autopsy Surgeon
 McHale's Navy (1963-1965) - Admiral Edgar Hardesy
 Lassie (1963-1965) - Dr. Walker / Ralph Henderson / Dr. Temple
 The Twilight Zone (1963) - Horn Player
 Burke's Law (1963) - Lt. Charlie Johnson
 Twelve O'Clock High (1964-1966) - Gen. Homer Stoneman
 Voyage to the Bottom of the Sea (1964-1965) - Admiral Johnson / Dr. Selby
 The Fugitive (1964) - Druggist
 Peyton Place (1965) - Dr. Kessler
 The Munsters (1965) - Charlie
 Batman  (1966) - Kolevater
 The F.B.I. (1965-1972) - Hotel Guest / Winston Keller / Hackett / Colonel Novin
 Daniel Boone (1966) - Chaumet
 Ironside (1967-1971) - Dr. Ward / Doctor / Dean Morris / Dr. Michaels
 The Time Tunnel (1967) - Dr. Raymond Swain
 The Invaders (1967) - Professor Ed Harrison / General
 Bonanza (1968-1972) - Judge Wilcox / Judge / Dr. Menring / Charles
 Lancer (1968-1969) - Hotel Clerk
 The Wild Wild West (1968) - Dr. Paul Eddington
 Mission: Impossible (1968) - Dr. Jacob Bowman
 The High Chaparral (1969) - Price
 Land of the Giants (1969) - Dr. Lalor
 Get Smart (1970) - Senator Brookside
 Cannon (1972-1975) - Arthur Allen Royce / Judge Holcomb / Theodore Croft
 All in the Family (1972) - Anesthetist
 The Streets of San Francisco (1974-1976) - Mr. Zabrockie / Mr. Schultz / Dr. Thompson
 Barnaby Jones (1974-1980) - Ralph Luxor / Mr. Stevenson
 Columbo (1974) - Coroner
 S.W.A.T. (1975) - Howard Redding
 Charlie's Angels (1976-1980) - Judge Towers / Dr. Stafford
 Little House on the Prairie (1979-1981) - Judge Adams
 Dallas (1978-1986) - Dr. Harlen Danvers (final appearance)

References

External links
 
 Recording for World Harvest Records--"Greatest Thing In The World"(Henry Drummond)

1908 births
1986 deaths
American male journalists
American male film actors
American male television actors
American people of Polish descent
Chicago Tribune people
Male actors from Chicago
20th-century American male actors
20th-century American non-fiction writers
20th-century American male writers